Orsola Faccioli or Licata Faccioli (August 16, 1823 –1906) was an Italian painter, mainly of vedute and interior scenes.

Biography
She was born in Vicenza, the last of seven siblings, of which only three reached adulthood. Her family arranged for her to study at the Accademia of Venice. In a number of contests, she won the silver medal at the Accademia. In 1848, she married  professor Siciliano Antonio (Antonino) Licata. She moved with him to Naples, but exhibited and traveled throughout Italy with him, till his death in 1892.

In 1867, she was named instructor of elements of design at the Neapolitan Istituto Privati degli  Educandati femminili. She was elected Academic Associates of the Academy of Fine Arts of Perugia, and of the Academy of Venice in 1864.<ref>[https://books.google.com/books?id=rmU1AAAAMAAJ Women in the Fine Arts: From the Seventh Century B.C. to the Twentieth Century A.D.], by Clara Erskine Clement Waters, 1904, page 212.</ref>

In the Pinacoteca di Vicenza there is a vedute incorporating historical events: Victor Emmanuel II shows himself to the people of Vicenza from the balcony of Palazzo Chiericati (painted 1869).Banca Intesa on exhibition of painting of Victor Emmanuel shows himself to people... Among other works: L'Isola di San Giorgio of Venice and Piazza Navona of Rome (Exhibited in Rome with Società degli Amatori e Cultori, 1851). At the Pinacoteca of the  Capodimonte Museum, were found: Il coro dei Cappuccini at Rome. The City of Naples possessed: La villa nazionale con la musica (nighttime interior); L'interior of the church of San Marcellino;  Interior of the chapel of the Immacolata of the Chiesa dell'Ascensione a Chiaia. The Casa Reale of Naples once displayed: Interior staircase of Palazzo Reale of Naples. At Hamburg, she displayed a canvas depicting: Veduta di Capodimonte; at Venice, Una veduta di San Marcellino. Her canvas of Il fiume Bacchiglione merited a silver medal first class at the Venice exhibition. Other works include Festa del 6 ottobre (exhibited at Promotrici Salvator Rosa, Naples in 1875); Una veduta della facciata di San Giorgio al Velabro (1851, Rome Società degli Amatori e Cultori); and Arum Italicum'', exhibited at Milan in 1881.

Her son, Giovanni Battista Licata (Naples 1859 - Jaldessa, near Harar, 1886), was a scientist and explorer, who was killed during a colonizing expedition by Count Pietro Porro to Harar, in Ethiopia. She is said to have stopped painting in 1892 when her husband died. She is buried in the cemetery of Poggioreale in Naples next to her husband.

References

1823 births
1906 deaths
19th-century Italian painters
20th-century Italian painters
Painters from Vicenza
Painters from Naples
Italian vedutisti
Italian women painters
20th-century Italian women artists
19th-century Italian women artists